Jon Grunde Vegard (born 15 November 1957) is a Norwegian diver. He was born in Tønsberg. He competed at the 1984 Summer Olympics in Los Angeles, in both platform, where he placed 11th, and in springboard.

References

External links

1957 births
Living people
Sportspeople from Tønsberg
Norwegian male divers
Olympic divers of Norway
Divers at the 1984 Summer Olympics